Lounsbury, also written Lounsbery or Lounsberry is a surname, and may refer to any one of the following:

Arthur Lounsbery (born 19??), Japanese voice actor
Ebenezer Lounsbery (c. 1787–1868), New York politician
Floyd Lounsbury (1914-1998), American linguist and anthropologist
George E. Lounsbury (1838-1904), Governor of Connecticut
Hewitt Lounsbury (ca. 1911–1971), Mayor of Anchorage, Alaska
Jim Lounsbury (1923–2006), American musician
John Lounsbery (1911-1976), American cartoon animator
Michael Lounsbury (born 1966), American organizational theorist
Phineas C. Lounsbury (1841-1925), Governor of Connecticut
Richard Lounsbery (1882–1967), American businessman
Robert H. Lounsberry (1918–2001), Iowa politician
Thomas Lounsbury (1838–1915), American literary historian and critic
William Lounsbery (1831-1905), U.S. Congressman from New York

See also
Lounsberry, New York
Lounsbury, one of the Neighbourhoods in North Bay, Ontario
Lounsbury Foods
Phineas Chapman Lounsbury House
Richard Lounsbery Award
Richard Lounsbery Foundation